The North Side Benches is the second album by Canadian singer-songwriter Jim Bryson.  Recorded primarily in Ottawa, Ontario, where Bryson is based, the album was released in 2003.

A version of the song "Somewhere Else" was also recorded by alternative country singer Kathleen Edwards on her 2003 album Back to Me.

Track listing
All songs written by Jim Bryson
 "Sleeping in Toronto"
 "Somewhere Else"
 "The Lost Occasional"
 "Elizabeth"
 "Fleetwood"
 "Captain Finch"
 "Feel Much Better"
 "Accidental Country Leaning"
 "Mean Streak"
 "At Least for Now"
 "Broken Fingers"

References

2003 albums
Jim Bryson albums